Nikolay Ivanovich Shaklein (born 1943) is a Russian politician, a former governor of Kirov Oblast in Russia. He rose in the ranks of the state prosecution service, becoming the deputy general prosecutor of the Russian Federation by 1999.

He has been a deputy of the State Duma. He was elected governor in a run-off on December 21, 2003, and was sworn in on January 14, 2004. Nikita Belykh succeeded him in 2008.

References

Living people
1943 births
Perm State University alumni
People from Kirovo-Chepetsky District
Second convocation members of the State Duma (Russian Federation)
Third convocation members of the State Duma (Russian Federation)
Governors of Kirov Oblast
Members of the Federation Council of Russia (after 2000)